Odis Tyrone Thompson (September 30, 1967 – May 4, 2019) was an American politician and a Democratic member of the Nevada Assembly, serving since being appointed on April 16, 2013. Thompson was previously a coordinator of homeless services for Southern Nevada Regional Planning Coalition. He died in office in 2019 at the age of 51.

References

External links

 Legislative page
 
 Biography at Ballotpedia

1967 births
2019 deaths
Democratic Party members of the Nevada Assembly
People from North Las Vegas, Nevada
21st-century American politicians
Northern Arizona University alumni
University of Phoenix alumni